The Island of Happy Days is a historic estate located on Stout Island in Red Cedar Lake, Barron County, Wisconsin. Built from 1909 to 1911, the estate was a summer home for the family of Frank Deming Stout, heir to the Knapp, Stout & Co. fortune. The estate was designed by Arthur Heun in a rustic style resembling Adirondack resorts. Stout and his family visited the home until Stout's death in 1927; he called it "the dearest place on earth". The home is now a resort called Stout's Island Lodge.

The Island of Happy Days was added to the National Register of Historic Places on February 24, 1995.

References

Buildings and structures in Barron County, Wisconsin
Rustic architecture in Wisconsin
Historic districts on the National Register of Historic Places in Wisconsin
National Register of Historic Places in Barron County, Wisconsin
Houses completed in 1911